Þórir Magnússon (born 13 February 1948) is an Icelandic former basketball player and the former member of the Icelandic national basketball team. Nicknamed "Rocket Man", he was known as a high scoring guard and led the Icelandic Basketball League in scoring for several seasons.

Career
On 20 February 1967 Þórir scored a league record 57 points for KFR against ÍS, breaking Einar Bollason’s record of 49 points. For the season he led all players in scoring, totalling 311 points for an average of 31.1 points per game.

Þórir led the league again in scoring in 1968, 1970, 1972 and 1973. In 1974, he won his third straight scoring title, setting a then league record in the process with 416 points.

On 17 March 1980 Þórir scored 32 points in a 100-93 victory against KR in the last game of the season, guaranteeing Valur the first place in the league and the clubs first national championship.

Icelandic national team
From 1967 to 1977, Þórir played 46 games for the Icelandic national team.

Awards, titles and accomplishments

Individual awards
Úrvalsdeild Player of the Year: 1974

Titles
Úrvalsdeild karla (2): 1980, 1983
Icelandic Basketball Cup (3): 1980, 1981, 1983

Accomplishments
Úrvalsdeild scoring champion (6): 1967, 1968, 1970, 1972, 1973, 1974

Personal life
Þórir's brother, Jóhannes Magnússon, played for several seasons in the Icelandic league. He played 15 games for the Icelandic national team from 1974 to 1976.

References

External links
Úrvalsdeild statistics 1978-1983

1948 births
Living people
Thorir Magnusson
Thorir Magnusson
Thorir Magnusson
Guards (basketball)